Neuven Stadium, also known as Stainton Park is a football ground in Radcliffe, Greater Manchester, which has hosted Radcliffe F.C. since 1970. It has a capacity of 3,500 (350 seated). The ground has been upgraded with floodlights, an all-weather pitch, terracing, and a sports clinic. The ground has always been known as Stainton Park but has been officially renamed Neuven Stadium for its sponsorship by Neuven Solutions Limited. Radcliffe FC have had a ground-sharing agreement with Bury AFC since August 2020.

References

Football venues in England
Sports venues completed in 1970